Mehrarun ke Durdasa (Bhojpuri: 𑂧𑂵𑂯𑂩𑂰𑂩𑂳𑂢 𑂍𑂵 𑂠𑂳𑂩𑂠𑂮𑂰 ; IAST: Meharārun ke durdasā; lit. "The Plight of Women") is a Bhojpuri play by Rahul Sankrityayan. It is the depiction of pathetic status of women in the male dominated society. It was published in the book named Tīn nāṭak (three plays) which was published in 1942.

Characters 

 Lachhimi : The Protagonist (girl) 
 Jasodara : Lachhimi's Friend
 Seeta : Lachhimi's Friend
 Ramkali : Lachhimi's Mother
 Sukha : Village women
 Udho Parsad : Lachhimi's Brother
Ramkhelawan Lal 
Farguddi Upadhiya

Theme

The play shows the problems, discrimination and tortures faced by women in the society like Female foeticide, Sati Practice, Parda system. The play also advocates equal property rights for women. Sometimes it has also criticised Idol worship.

References

 Bhojpuri language
1942 plays